Fatehabad Chandrawatiganj is a small town in Madhya Pradesh in Central India. It lies on the border of Ujjain district and Indore district. It has its own railway station. Fatehabad and Chandrawatiganj are two villages are very nearly to each other but the fatehabad is under Ujjain district and Chandrawatiganj is under Indore district.

Fatehabad Chandrawatiganj has its railway junction on the Ratlam–Indore line with a link line going to Ujjain Junction. The Fatehabad–Ujjain section of this route is undergoing gauge-conversion of Indian Railways.

References

Cities and towns in Ujjain district